East Asians in the United Kingdom are East Asians living in the United Kingdom. They have been present in the country since the 17th century and primarily originate from countries such as China, Hong Kong (SAR of China), Japan, South Korea and Taiwan. They are called "East Asian" or "Oriental", although – dependent upon the context – the use of the term "Oriental" might be considered by some to be derogatory or offensive. In the 2001 British census, the term Chinese or Other is used.

In the 2001 Census, East Asians were included in the "Asian or Asian British" grouping in England and Wales, and in the "Asian, Asian Scottish or Asian British" grouping in Scotland. The 2011 Census questionnaire grouped East Asians under a broad "Asian/Asian British" ("Asian, Asian Scottish or Asian British" in Scotland) heading in all parts of the UK.

Population history
East Asian Britons are generally viewed as a distinct ethnic group or identity, and have been academically studied as such. The first settlement of Chinese people in the United Kingdom dates from the early 19th century. In particular were port cities such as Liverpool and London; particularly the Limehouse area in East London. Today, most of the British Chinese are people or are descended from people who were themselves overseas Chinese when they entered the United Kingdom. The majority are from former British colonies, such as Hong Kong, Malaysia, Burma, Singapore, Canada, Australia and New Zealand, and also other countries such as Vietnam. People from mainland China and Taiwan and their descendants constitute a relatively small proportion of the British Chinese community. Hong Kong people in the United Kingdom are people from Hong Kong resident in the United Kingdom, or British nationals of Hong Kong origin. At the time of the 2001 British census, 96,000 people born in Hong Kong were residing in the UK, while 2009 estimates suggest that 78,000 Hong Kong-born people are resident in the UK.

The first Japanese settled in the 1960s, mainly for business and economic purposes. In recent decades this number has been growing; including immigrants, students, and businessmen. Parts of the United Kingdom, in particular London, have significant Japanese populations; such as Golders Green and East Finchley North London. There are approximately 100,000 British Japanese, mostly settled in London and the surrounding South East.

Large numbers of South Koreans began to settle in the U.K. in the 1980s, mostly near London; the highest concentration can be found in the town of New Malden, where estimates of the South Korean population range from 8,000 to as high as 20,000 people. There are also a few North Koreans; they form the ninth-largest national group of asylum seekers, with a total of 850 applicants, including 245 applications in the first seven months of the year alone, thirteen times the number in all of 2007.

Subgroups
East Asians
Chinese
Mongolians
Japanese
Koreans
Hong Kongers

Notable people
Nat Wei, Baron Wei, writing for The Telegraph in 2012, described himself as the only East Asian person politically involved in Westminster.

See also
 British East and Southeast Asian
 Southeast Asians in the United Kingdom
 Asian Americans
 Asian Canadians
 Asian Australians
 Asian New Zealanders
 British Asian

References

External links
 BORN ABROAD, An Immigration Map of Britain, BBC News.

Asian diaspora in the United Kingdom
British people of East Asian descent